Gonzalo Rubén Piovi (born 8 September 1994) is an Argentine professional footballer who plays as a left-back for Racing Club.

Career
Piovi's professional career began in 2013 with Argentine Primera División side Vélez Sarsfield. He first appeared as an unused substitute in a league match against All Boys on 19 August, prior to making his debut in November versus Quilmes. Two more appearances followed for Vélez, including in the 2014 Copa Libertadores against The Strongest, before Piovi completed a transfer to fellow Primera División club Argentinos Juniors in January 2015. It took Piovi until March 2016 to make his bow for Argentinos, playing the full ninety minutes in a goalless draw with Temperley.

In June 2016, Piovi extended his contract with the club. However, on 29 January 2018, Piovi completed a move to Racing Club. Eight months later, after featuring in five matches for Racing Club, he departed the club on loan in August after agreeing to join Gimnasia y Esgrima. He featured in twenty-seven matches in all competitions for Gimnasia, whilst also scoring his first senior goal in a Copa de la Superliga win over Newell's Old Boys on 21 April 2019. A loan to fellow top-flight team Defensa y Justicia followed in July. His debut came in a Copa Argentina win over former club Gimnasia on 20 July.

After appearing nine times in one season with Defensa, the defender returned to his parent club in June 2020. A third loan out of Racing was confirmed on 30 August as Piovi agreed to join Colón.

Personal life
Piovi's brother, Lucas, is also a professional footballer.

Career statistics
.

Honours
Argentinos Juniors
Primera B Nacional: 2016–17

References

External links

1994 births
Living people
People from Morón Partido
Argentine people of Italian descent
Argentine footballers
Association football defenders
Argentine Primera División players
Primera Nacional players
Club Atlético Vélez Sarsfield footballers
Argentinos Juniors footballers
Racing Club de Avellaneda footballers
Club de Gimnasia y Esgrima La Plata footballers
Defensa y Justicia footballers
Club Atlético Colón footballers
Sportspeople from Buenos Aires Province